Maximum Security (foaled May 14, 2016) is a champion American Thoroughbred racehorse who was the 2019 Champion Three-Year-Old after winning the Florida Derby, Haskell Invitational, Bold Ruler Handicap, and Cigar Mile. Maximum Security crossed the finish line first in the 2019 Kentucky Derby, but was disqualified for interference.

As a four-year-old in 2020, he won the inaugural running of the Saudi Cup in January. On March 9, his trainer Jason Servis was indicted on multiple federal charges related to the administration of performance-enhancing drugs to his stable. Maximum Security was allegedly administered a designer drug that was considered undetectable. He was transferred to the barn of Bob Baffert and returned to racing on July 25, when he won the San Diego Handicap, followed by a win in the Pacific Classic.

Background
Maximum Security is a bay colt who was bred in Kentucky by Gary and Mary West, for whom he races as a homebred. He was sired by New Year's Day, who won the 2014 Breeders' Cup Juvenile for the Wests. As a sire New Year's Day was considered a disappointment and was sold in late 2018 to a Brazilian syndicate for a reported $5 million: Maximum Security subsequently became his first graded stakes winner. Maximum Security's dam Lil Indy, by Anasheed, is a half-sister to multiple Grade I winner Flat Out.

Maximum Security was originally trained by Jason Servis, known for his high winning percentage. Servis credited his success to unconventional training methods with a focus on slow, regular gallops with brief bursts of speed at the end, compared to the faster but less frequent workouts by most other trainers. After Servis was indicted in March 2020 for doping related allegations, Maximum Security was moved to the barn of Bob Baffert.

Racing career 
Maximum Security had "unspecified physical issues" as a two-year-old and did not make his first start until December 20, 2018 in a maiden claiming race. He won in commanding fashion by  lengths. In that race, he could have been claimed for $16,000, but fortunately for the Wests was not.

Three-year-old season
Maximum Security began his three-year-old campaign by winning two starter optional claiming races at Gulfstream Park in early 2019, both of them over sprint distances, by a combined distance of  lengths. He was then stepped up in both class and distance when entered in the Grade I Florida Derby at a distance of  miles on March 30. Maximum Security went to the early lead and set a reasonable pace, trailed by longshot Bodexpress. He was never challenged and won by  lengths, with favorites Hidden Scroll and Code of Honor well back. Maximum Security earned 100 points on the 2019 Road to the Kentucky Derby, instantly qualifying him for the Kentucky Derby.

Kentucky Derby

In the Kentucky Derby, Maximum Security set the pace of the race. Going around the far turn, Maximum Security swerved out from the rail while still on the lead, impeding the progress of several other horses. While Maximum Security regained his momentum and crossed the finish line first, he was disqualified to 17th place after 20 minutes of deliberation by the stewards. Second-place Country House, who went off at odds of 65–1, was awarded first. Maximum Security was the first horse to cross the finish line first in the Kentucky Derby only to be disqualified for an on-track infraction. The only other winner to be disqualified in the Kentucky Derby up until that point in time had been Dancer's Image, who was disqualified in 1968 for a drug infraction.

The disqualification was controversial, especially in the Derby which is often a roughly run race due to the large field. Jockey Luis Saez said the horse had shied away from the noise of the infield crowd, but was immediately brought under control. Maximum Security did not materially affect Country House, who was awarded the victory. However, his swerve did affect several other horses and could have caused a major accident if he had clipped heels with another horse. Saez was subsequently suspended for 15 days for "failure to control his mount".

On May 14, 2019, the owners of Maximum Security sued in U.S. District Court in Frankfort, Kentucky, seeking to reinstate the win and distribute purse money based on the actual order of finish. On June 8, the Kentucky Horse Racing Commission filed a motion requesting dismissal of the lawsuit, stating that it "threatens to turn the 'most exciting two minutes in sports' into tedious, protracted litigation." In November 2019, the lawsuit was dismissed, citing "the stewards’ decision in determining fouls and disqualifications of horses is final and not subject to appeal".

Post-Derby races
Maximum Security's owners chose not to enter him in the Preakness or the Belmont. He returned to the track on June 16, when he was made 1-20 favorite for the Pegasus Stakes at Monmouth Park, but sustained an upset defeat as he was beaten by a length by King for a Day.

On July 20, Maximum Security was entered in the Haskell Invitational Stakes at Monmouth Park, going off as the 4-5 favorite in a field of six. He rated in third behind the early pace set by Bethlehem Road and King for a Day, tracked by Mucho Gusto. Around the far turn, first Bethlehem Road and then King for a Day dropped back, leaving Maximum Security and Mucho Gusto to battle for the lead. At the eighth pole, Maximum Security was a head in front but Mucho Gusto appeared to have the momentum. Maximum Security rallied and drew away to win by  lengths. He then faced a stewards' inquiry after he appeared to bear in slightly on the far turn when King for a Day started to tire. However, the stewards ruled that there was no cause for disqualification.

The win moved Maximum Security back into contention for champion three-year-old honors. However, he missed a planned start in the Travers Stakes because he was not training up to expectations. "I don't like where he's at," said Servis on August 15. "He's not eating the way I want him to eat, and he's not carrying the weight I'd like to see him carry."

He was next entered in the Pennsylvania Derby, but was scratched 5 days before the race due to a large colon nephrosplenic entrapment. He was rushed to the Mid-Atlantic Equine Clinic where he was diagnosed with colic. "He just got his [colon] displaced tightly enough that it was extremely painful," said Gasiorowski. "He was sent to our clinic immediately and we managed to get him to correct without doing surgery."

His connections gave him time to recover, and ruled out his participation in the 2019 Breeders' Cup. They instead entered him in the Bold Ruler Handicap on October 26, which he won in front running fashion by  lengths. "I knew we were going to get criticized for running in a Grade III race by ignoramuses who don't know that after a horse has colic and is off for three months, you don't want to start him at a mile and a quarter," said West. "But I'm immune to that. Jason knows the right thing to do with the horse, and I know the right thing to do with the horse."

Maximum Security finished his three-year-old campaign by winning the Cigar Mile Handicap on December 7 at Aqueduct Racetrack as the 6-5 favorite. His main rival was considered to be Spun to Run, who had won the Breeders' Cup Dirt Mile. Maximum Security went to the early lead and was soon joined by Spun to Run. The two raced together for the first three-quarters of a mile until Maximum Security started to pull away at the head of the stretch. He won by  lengths in a time of 1:36.46.

Gary West told The Blood-Horse in December 2019 that he was keeping the horse in training for 2020. He was leaning towards running Maximum Security in the inaugural Saudi Cup, to be held on King Abdulaziz Racetrack in Riyadh, Saudi Arabia on February 29. He had initially considered the Pegasus World Cup at Gulfstream Park in January, but ruled that out after it was announced that its purse would be cut from $9 million to $3 million.

Maximum Security was named the American Champion Three-Year-Old Male Horse at the 49th annual Eclipse Awards with 217 out of 241 votes. "It's a special honor for Mary and me," said Gary West. "It will not make up for what happened in the Kentucky Derby, but it's a nice way to close the year."

Four-year-old season
On January 1, 2020, it was announced that Coolmore Stud had purchased a 50% share in Maximum Security.

Maximum Security was shipped to Saudi Arabia in February 2020 for the inaugural $20 million Saudi Cup, run on February 29 over a distance of nine furlongs. The field contained multiple Grade/Group One winners from around the world including Midnight Bisou (American Champion Older Female Horse), Mucho Gusto (2020 Pegasus World Cup winner), Benbatl (2019 Caulfield Stakes winner), McKinzie (2019 Alysheba Stakes and 2019 Whitney Stakes winner), Chrysoberyl (undefeated 2019 Japan Dirt Derby winner), and Gold Dream (2017 Champions Cup winner). Capezzano set the early pace, followed closely by Mucho Gusto with Maximum Security tracking them a few lengths behind. Mucho Gusto moved to the lead as they entered the far turn, then swung very wide as they entered the stretch. Maximum Security, who had started his move on the outside, switched paths and started to make up ground. He passed Mucho Gusto with about 100 yards remaining, then held off Midnight Bisou, who made a late run along the rail. "It was a tough race but we did it," said Saez. "For a second I thought we were going to be beaten but he has such a big heart. He's the toughest horse I've ridden.

After Servis was indicted in March for doping allegations, Maximum Security was transferred to the barn of Bob Baffert. He was given an extensive exam that revealed some minor lameness but no serious long-term damage. He was given a layoff to recover and also to ensure that any drugs were cleared from his system, then resumed galloping on April 29.

He made his first start for Baffert in the San Diego Handicap at Del Mar on July 25, carrying top weight of 127 pounds. He took the early lead around the first turn but was then challenged by Midcourt as they moved into the backstretch. Maximum Security dropped back then shifted to the outside around the final turn and started to make up ground. Midcourt fought back and the two horses dueled down the stretch, with Maximum Security winning by a neck. "I knew I didn't have him really drummed up for this race," said Baffert. "He won today when he had every reason to get beat. He showed what a great horse he is today."

His next start was the Pacific Classic Stakes at Del Mar Racetrack, where he was the 2-5 favorite in a field of six that included Higher Power, who had won the race in 2019, and multiple graded stakes winners Midcourt and Sharp Samurai. Maximum Security broke sharply and set a moderate pace of :23.93 for the first quarter-mile and :47.98 for the half. When Sharp Samurai and Higher Power tried to challenge him on the final turn, he responded. Nearing the quarter pole he began to edge away from Sharp Samurai, and won going away by  lengths. This gave him an automatic berth into the Breeders' Cup Classic.

On September 26, he raced in the 2020 Awesome Again Stakes. This was a highly anticipated match up between Maximum Security and his stablemate Improbable, who had won the Grade 1 Hollywood Gold Cup and Grade 1 Whitney Stakes earlier in the year. Maximum Security stalked the pace set by Take The One O One, until the far turn, when Improbable rallied from last to take the lead. Maximum Security briefly tried to engage his stablemate, but he couldn't match Improbable and finished in second place.

In the Breeders' Cup Classic on November 7 in Keeneland he was one of the favorites, but he lost ground in the last corner and finished fifth. His stablemates Authentic and Improbable finished 1st and 2nd.

Racing statistics

Doping allegations
Maximum Security was specifically named as one of the horses that had been administered performance-enhancing drugs when trainer Jason Servis was indicted on March 9, 2020. Maximum Security was allegedly administered a designer drug, SGF-1000, "intended to promote tissue repair and increase a horse's stamina and endurance." The FBI intercepted a phone call where Servis indicated concern that Maximum Security would test positive after being administered the drug shortly before a random drug test on June 5, 2019. Servis was advised that there was "no test for it (SGF-1000) in America", but that the test might show a false positive for a different drug, "dex" (assumed to be Dexamethasone). A veterinarian subsequently agreed to alter Maximum Security's records to falsely show the horse was administered "dex" to explain any such result.

Because of the charges, some industry leaders questioned whether Maximum Security should be stripped of the Eclipse Award he won as a three-year-old, especially if subsequent testing revealed previously undetected drug positives. The owners of Midnight Bisou (second to Maximum Security in the Saudi Cup) called for his disqualification from that race. Following Servis' guilty plea in December 2022, owner Gary West released a statement saying that he would support a disqualification of Maximum Security from his Saudi Cup victory by racing officials in Saudi Arabia, saying that it would be the correct decision. The Jockey Club of Saudi Arabia later announced that they would assess their ability to conclude the 2020 Saudi Cup investigation "in a robust and comprehensive fashion."

Pedigree

See also
 List of historical horses

References

American racehorses
2016 racehorse births
Racehorses trained in the United States
Thoroughbred family 1-n
Eclipse Award winners
Racehorses bred in Kentucky
Saudi Cup winners